Stoke Space Technologies is an American space launch company based in the Seattle suburb of Kent, Washington.

History
The company was founded by a group of former Blue Origin and SpaceX employees.

In May 2020 the company won a $225,000 SBIR Phase I grant from the National Science Foundation to work on an integrated propulsion solution for reusable rocket upper stages.

In February 2021 the company raised $9.1 million in seed funding in a round led by venture funds NFX and MaC Ventures.

In December 2021 the company raised $65 million in a Series A round, funding development and testing of the upper stage of a reusable launch vehicle. Breakthrough Energy Ventures, the multibillion-dollar clean-tech initiative created by Microsoft co-founder Bill Gates, was leading the round.

Facilities
The company operates a rocket test facility on a  site near Moses Lake’s airport.

Technology
Their reusable second-stage design uses uses engines around the circumference of the vehicle along with a center passive bleed to create an aerospike engine-like effect without actually using aerospike engines. Additionally, the center bleed acts as a barrier gas during re-entry which eliminates the need for brittle ceramic tiles that have required detailed inspections and lengthy refurbishments on other space vehicles.

References

Further reading

External links 
 Official website: https://www.stokespace.com

Private spaceflight companies
Rocket engine manufacturers of the United States
Aerospace companies of the United States
Companies based in Seattle
Companies based in Washington (state)
Technology companies established in 2019